Balta is the name of several rural localities in Russia:
Balta, Republic of Buryatia, an ulus in Mukhorshibirsky District of the Republic of Buryatia
Balta, Republic of North Ossetia–Alania, a selo under the administrative jurisdiction of the city of Vladikavkaz, Republic of North Ossetia–Alania
Balta, Novosibirsk Oblast, a village in Moshkovsky District of Novosibirsk Oblast